Henry Whitworth "Harry" Hole (10 December 1855 – 23 June 1942) was a New Zealand cricketer who took 10 wickets on the first day of his only first-class match.

At the age of 19, Harry Hole was one of 10 players, five on each team, who were making their first-class debuts in the match between Nelson and Wellington at Victory Square, Nelson, in February 1875. Wellington batted first, and Hole opened the bowling for Nelson. He bowled throughout the innings, taking 8 for 37 off 18 overs as Wellington were dismissed for 93. Nelson went in and made 100. Wellington batted again and were 40 for 5 at stumps on the first day. Hole again opened the bowling, and took the first two wickets but, "somewhat tired by his exertions", delivered only six overs before being relieved. He did not bowl again in the match. On the second day Nelson dismissed Wellington for 71 and then made 65 for eight to win by two wickets. Hole is one of the six players in the history of first-class cricket to take 10 or more wickets in his only match.

Harry Hole moved to the North Island, where he ran hotels and general stores in Taupo and then Kerioi in the Wanganui area. He married Maggie Taylor in Wanganui on 23 December 1890. He entered the brewing business as a brewery manager in 1890 and became a partner with Hope Gibbons in the Wanganui Brewery in 1895.

In 1900 he lent his rural property at Tayforth, west of Wanganui, to the armed forces for several days of manoeuvres. About 1400 troops were involved. By 1904 he had moved to a property north of Upokongaro on the Whanganui River, where he farmed sheep.

Apart from cricket he also played football and lawn bowls. In 1938, at 83, he was "the second oldest bowler in Wanganui".

References

External links

1855 births
1942 deaths
New Zealand businesspeople
Nelson cricketers
People from Crediton
English emigrants to New Zealand
New Zealand cricketers